The Elm is a range of hills north of the Harz mountains in the Helmstedt and Wolfenbüttel districts of Lower Saxony, Germany. It has a length of about 25 km (15.5 mi) and a width of 3–8 km (2–5 mi) and rises to an elevation of 323 meters. Surrounded by the Northern European Lowlands, the Elm is almost uninhabited and the largest beech forest in Northern Germany. The hills are of a triassic limestone called Elmkalkstein. Together with the neighbouring Lappwald range, the Elm has been a protected nature park since 1977.

The Elm is a popular among hikers, cyclists, and motor cyclists.

Rivers originating in the Elm include:

 Altenau
 Lutter
 Missaue
 Scheppau
 Schunter
 Wabe

Towns on the edge of the Elm include:

 Königslutter
 Schöningen
 Schöppenstedt

Elevations

Eilumer Horn (323,3 m)
Osterberg (c. 314 m)
Drachenberg (c. 313 m)
Burgberg (c. 311 m)
Amplebener Berg (310 m)
Kleiner Tafelberg (c. 302 m)
Kiefelhorn (301 m)
Großer Tafelberg (296 m)
Warberg (290 m)
Wolfsburger Kopf (289 m)

Sources 
 Heinz-Bruno Krieger: Elmsagen. Oeding, Braunschweig-Schöppenstedt 1967.
 Heinz Röhr: Der Elm. Oeding, Braunschweig-Schöppenstedt 1962.
 

 
Protected areas of Lower Saxony
Protected landscapes in Germany
Forests and woodlands of Lower Saxony
Hill ranges of Lower Saxony